Jonathan French Beecher (born 1937) is a historian who has taught at the University of California, Santa Cruz since the early 1970s. He specializes in French history and European intellectual history, including Russian. He received his B.A. and his Ph.D from Harvard University and also was a student at the Ecole Normale Supérieure in Paris for two years.

He authored a biography on the utopian socialist Charles Fourier. He has also written a biography of Victor Considerant.

References and sources
References

Sources

External links
Profile from the University of California, Santa Cruz Department of History
Official website

1937 births
Living people
Historians of France
University of California, Santa Cruz faculty
Harvard University alumni
21st-century American historians
21st-century American male writers
American male non-fiction writers